The 1971 UCI Road World Championships took place from 4-5 September 1971 in Mendrisio, Switzerland.

Results

Medal table

External links 

 Men's results
 Women's results
  Results at sportpro.it

 
UCI Road World Championships by year
UCI Road World Championships 1971
UCI Road World Championships
Uci Road World Championships, 1971
UCI Road World Championships